Telecable is a cable company that operates in Asturias (northern Spain) offering triple play services (telephone, Internet and television) as well as mobile phone services as an MVNO since 2007.

The company started out as Telecable de Oviedo, Telecable de Gijón and Telecable de Avilés in 1995. In December 1998 it is given a license to work in all Asturias. From 2011, it started deploying a fiber network infrastructure in another Spanish region, Extremadura. In 2015 the company was acquired by Zegona Communications plc for a sum of 640 million euros. In July 2017, Euskaltel acquired Telecable.

See also
 Cogent Communications
 Euskaltel — Basque telecommunications company, owner of Telecable
 Tata Communications
 R — Galician telecommunications company, also subsidiary of Euskaltel

References

External links
Official website

Asturias
Cable television companies of Spain